Massimiliano Zazzetta (born 10 October 1979) is an Italian footballer who plays as a midfielder or defender.

Career

Juventus
Born in San Benedetto del Tronto, Marche, Zazzetta started his professional career at Piedmontese club Juventus F.C. After spending 1998–99 Serie C2 season at Pisa, he was sold to Como in co-ownership deal for 250 million lire. (€129,114) After only one appearance, Zazzetta returned to Turin for 150 million lire, Juventus paid Como via the sale of Manuel Sinato (150 million lire) and Luca Pellegrini (100 million lire; who returned to Juve in June 2001). Zazzetta signed a new 4-year contract with The Old Lady.

He spent 3 seasons in Serie C2 with 3 different clubs. The club got €10,000 from Teramo, but unable to cover the amortization cost of about €51,646 a season. In summer 2003 Zazzetta was released by Juventus, and the club write-down the residual contract value of Zazzetta, for about €51,000 [€51,646 = (250+150 million lire) over 4, 1 euro = 1936.27 lire]

Viterbese
Zazzetta spent 5 seasons with Viterbese. The club bankrupted in 2008.

San Marino
Zazzetta joined Sammarinese club San Marino Calcio in March 2009. He made 5 appearances in Italian 2008–09 Lega Pro Seconda Divisione. Zazzetta also played 1 of the 2 relegation "play-out" for the club, which the team winning Poggibonsi.

Sambenedettese
At the start of 2009–10 season Zazzetta returned to hometown club Sambenedettese. Zazzetta scored 4 times in 33 appearances in Eccellenza Marche. The club was the winner and promoted. In 2010–11 Serie D Zazzetta played 27 times and scored once. Zazzetta renewed his contract in June 2011.

References

External links
 FIGC 
 Football.it Profile 
 Sambenedettese Profile 

Italian footballers
Italy youth international footballers
Juventus F.C. players
Pisa S.C. players
Como 1907 players
Calcio Padova players
S.S. Teramo Calcio players
Alma Juventus Fano 1906 players
U.S. Viterbese 1908 players
A.S.D. Victor San Marino players
A.S. Sambenedettese players
People from San Benedetto del Tronto
1979 births
Living people
Association football defenders
Association football midfielders
Sportspeople from the Province of Ascoli Piceno
Footballers from Marche